İller Bankası Women's Volleyball, shortly İlbank, is a women's volleyball team of İller Bankası Youth and Sports Club in Ankara, Turkey, sponsored by the Turkish state-owned bank of İller Bankası. Founded in 1995, the club's colors are blue and gold. The team is playing its home matches at the Selim Sırrı Tarcan Sport Hall.

The club's president is Tuncay Karaman. The women's volleyball team is coached by Burhan Canpolat. The team plays in the Turkish Women's Volleyball League in the 2012-13 season.

International success

  BVA Cup:
Winners (2): 2012, 2014
Runners-up (1): 2010

Current squad
2012-13 season

Notable players

  Dilara Bağcı
  Meryem Boz
  Songül Dikmen
  Gizem Giraygil 
  Zülfiye Gündoğdu
  Seda Tokatlıoğlu
  Marina Tumas
  Alessya Safronova
  Alica Szekelyova
   Gina Mambru

References

External links

 Official club website 

Volleyball clubs in Ankara
Women's volleyball teams in Turkey
Volleyball clubs established in 1995
1995 establishments in Turkey